Tak Oi Secondary School is a girl's secondary school situated in Tsz Wan Shan, Wong Tai Sin, Hong Kong. It was established in 1970 by the Missionary Sisters of the Immaculate Conception, M.I.C.

It was founded in 1970 in response to the needs of the Hong Kong society and the request of the Catholic Bishop Lawrence Bianchi. At that time, the Government was developing the area of Tsz Wan Shan, a district near Wong Tai Sin in East Kowloon.

The official opening of the school and unveiling of the plaque was officiated by Mr. J. Canning, Director of Education in 1971.

The name of the school "Tak Oi" meaning "Good Love", was specially chosen to complete the theological Virtues of Faith, Hope and Love, which are also the names of the M.I.C. schools in Hong Kong (Tak Sun School, Good Hope School, Tak Oi Secondary School).

The school uses English as a medium of instruction.

Secondary schools in Hong Kong
Wong Tai Sin District